Vilma Kadlečková (* May 27, 1971, Prague) is a Czech Science fiction and Fantasy writer.

Bibliography 
 Na pomezí Eternaalu (Winston Smith, Prague 1990) – a sci-fi novel from the cycle 'Legends about argenite'
 Jednou bude tma (Laser, Plzeň 1991) – a collection of short sci-fi stories
 Meče Lorgan (Návrat, Brno 1993) – a sci-fi novel from the cycle 'Legends about argenite'
 Stavitelé věží (Altar, Prague 1994) – a novel from the cycle 'Legends about argenite'
 Pán všech krůpějí (Netopejr, Olomouc 2000) – fantasy novel
 O snovačce a přemyslovi (In: Imperium Bohemorum, Albatros, Prague 2007) - fantasy novel
 Lunapark Luna (In: Hvězdy české sci–fi, Argo, Prague 2010) - a novel from the cycle 'Legends about argenite'
 Na pomezí Eternaalu (Albatros Plus, Prague 2010) – second edition of the novel, with added short stories from the cycle 'Legends about argenite'
 Tajná kniha Šerosvitu (Albatros, Prague 2011) – fantasy for children, a joint project of five female writers (with Karolina Francová, Sanča Fülle, Vilma Kadlečková, Lucie Lukačovičová, Julie Nováková)
 Starýma očima, za tisíc let (In: Krvavá čest, Triton, Prague 2012)
 Mycelium I: Jantarové oči (Argo, Prague 2013)
 Mycelium II: Led pod kůží (Argo, Prague 2013)
 Mycelium III: Pád do temnot (Argo, Prague 2014)
 Mycelium IV: Vidění (Argo, Prague 2014)
 Mycelium V: Hlasy a hvězdy (Argo, Prague 2016)
 Mycelium VI: Vrstva ticha (Argo, Prague 2021)
 Mycelium VII: Zakázané směry (Argo, Prague 2022)
 Mycelium VIII: Program apokalypsy (Argo, Prague 2022)

Awards
Na pomezí Eternaalu - awarded with "Mlok" 1990 in prize "O Cenu Karla Čapka"
Stavitelé věží -  awarded with "Mlok" 1993 in prize O Cenu Karla Čapka
O snovačce a přemyslovi - prize of "Akademie SFFH" 2007 (Czech) in the short story category
Lunapark Luna - prize of "Akademie SFFH" 2007 (Czech) in the short story category
Starýma očima, za tisíc let - readers prize Aeronautilus (Czech) for year 2012 in short story category
Mycelium I: Jantarové oči - prize of "Akademie SFFH" 2013 (Czech) for book of the year and original Czech/Slovak book
Mycelium III: Pád do temnot - prize of "Akademie SFFH" 2014 (Czech) for book of the year and original Czech/Slovak book

External links 
 Record in Who is who in Czech/Slovak SF
 Web Legie
 Web Scifibaze
 Author's pages
 Web of the project "Secret book of Twilight"
 Web of Mycelium saga (Czech)

Living people
1971 births
Czech women writers
Czech science fiction writers